Streptomyces albidochromogenes is a bacterium species from the genus Streptomyces.

See also 
 List of Streptomyces species

References

Further reading

External links
Type strain of Streptomyces albidochromogenes at BacDive -  the Bacterial Diversity Metadatabase

albidochromogenes
Bacteria described in 1986